Francisco Jorge Stanley Albaitero (3 July 1942 – 7 June 1999), known by his stage name Paco Stanley, was a Mexican television entertainer who worked for Televisa and TV Azteca.

Career
In 1966, his first father-in-law paid for his radio and elocution classes. In 1969 he started in radio. From 1974, he participated in television programs like XEW News. For this network, he hosted the show "Smiles and Surprises". He also worked in "Estrellas W".

After years of being a sidekick to comedians such as Madaleno, in 1995 he was offered his own show on Televisa, ¡Ándale!, with Arlette Garibay and Benito Castro. Later shows were Llévatelo and Pácatelas with Mario Bezáres.

In 1998, he hosted the show "Un poco de Paco en radio" in its comic version.

He left Televisa and signed a contract in 1998 with rival network TV Azteca. On December 15, he started his show Una tras otra co-starring Jorge Gil and Mario Bezares. In 1999, he launched a nighttime show titled "Si hay, y bien!".

Theatre was another passion for Paco. He starred in the play "Don Juan Tenorio" in its comic version. He toured all over Mexico with this show.

He also liked poetry and recorded three albums with his poems.

Personal life
Stanley's first marriage was with Maria Solis, with whom he had only one son, Francisco.  After several years, he married Patricia Pedroza, with whom he had two children, Leslie and Francisco Stanley Pedroza. However, in an extramarital relationship Paco had a third son, Paul Stanley (Now host of the morning program HOY but later moved to the USA and currently hosts the morning program Despierta America).

Death
On 7 June 1999, Paco Stanley, Mario Bezares and Jorge Gil left the TV Azteca studios after their morning show "Una Tras Otra" to eat in a famous Mexican restaurant "El Charco de las Ranas" located in Periferico, Mexico City's busy beltway. When they all finished, Paco and Mario went to the restroom at the same time, while Jorge was waiting for them. Paco finished first and he told Mario that he was going to wait for him outside (in his car). While Paco, Jorge and his driver were waiting inside his black Lincoln Navigator, three subjects walked towards the car and started shooting, firing more than 20 rounds, killing him with 4 shots, 3 of them hitting him in the head, and wounding Jorge Gil and other bystanders.

Mario Bezares left the restroom as he heard the gunfire. The waiters from the restaurant would not let him leave, thinking that the assailants were after him as well.

Mexico was shocked with the news of Paco Stanley's death. Mexican TV networks, Televisa and TV Azteca interrupted their programming to give out the news. In that day while the news was given out, two news anchors from TV Azteca and the president of TV Azteca Ricardo Salinas Pliego started blaming Mexico City's mayor Cuauhtemoc Cardenas of not knowing how to govern, due to the high crime rate in the city.

On the autopsy, the General Attorney of Mexico City, Samuel del Villar  briefly informed that in the corpse, there was found a legal ID of Stanley corresponding to a branch of the National Security Ministry allowing him to carry firearms. Also, a bag containing 0.02 g of cocaine was found in his shirt, according to the City attorney, on a national TV broadcast press conference.

Mario Bezares and another of Stanley's colleagues, Paola Durante, were arrested in connection with the murder and jailed for over a year before being released. On April 5, 2011, Luis Alberto Salazar Vega was arrested and charged with Stanley's murder, based on the testimony of a former cellmate.

Legacy
One of the sketches from Andale!, La Güereja y El Papiringo, with Maria Elena Saldaña as the little girl, became a television series of its own as La Güereja y Algo Mas and La Güereja de mi Vida.

References

1942 births
1999 deaths
Deaths by firearm in Mexico
Mexican male television actors
Mexican male comedians
Mexican radio presenters
Mexican television presenters
Mexican people of English descent
Assassinated television people
Assassinated radio people
Members of the Chamber of Deputies (Mexico)
Institutional Revolutionary Party politicians
National Autonomous University of Mexico alumni
Mexican murder victims
People murdered in Mexico
20th-century Mexican male actors
20th-century comedians